James Bacon was an American architect. A building of his, the Bacon Hotel, in Whitehall, Arkansas, is listed on the National Register of Historic Places.

References

American architects
Year of birth missing
Year of death missing